North Hurley is a census-designated place in Grant County, New Mexico, United States. Its population was 300 as of the 2010 census. The community is located north of Hurley along U.S. Route 180.

Geography

Demographics

References

Census-designated places in New Mexico
Census-designated places in Grant County, New Mexico